The John C. Feehan House, on Main St. in Murray, Idaho, was built in 1891.  It was listed on the National Register of Historic Places in 1980.

It is a one-story hewn log building with some aspect of Greek Revival style.

References

National Register of Historic Places in Shoshone County, Idaho
Greek Revival architecture in Idaho
Houses completed in 1891